Kevin Calvey (born July 13, 1966) is an American attorney and politician who has served as an Oklahoma County Commissioner for District 3 since 2019. He previously served in the Oklahoma House of Representatives as the member for the 94th district from 1998 to 2006 and as the member for the 82nd district from 2014 to 2018. Calvey ran for Oklahoma's 5th congressional district in 2006 and 2010, losing the Republican primaries to Mary Fallin and James Lankford respectively. In 2022, was the Republican nominee for Oklahoma County district attorney. He received 45.61% of the vote, losing to Democrat Vicki Behenna with 54.4% of the vote.

Calvey served as a JAG prosecutor from 2007 to 2008 in Baghdad during the Iraq War.

Oklahoma House of Representatives (1998-2006)
Calvey served in the Oklahoma House of Representatives from 1998 to 2006.

2006 Congressional campaign
Calvey ran for Oklahoma's 5th congressional district in 2006. He lost the Republican primary to Mary Fallin.

Military service
Calvey joined the Oklahoma National Guard during while in office. He was deployed to Iraq between January 28, 2007, and January 27, 2008 during the Iraq War. While deployed he served as a prosecutor in Baghdad. He reached the rank of Captain and earned a Bronze Star for his service.

2010 Congressional campaign
In 2010, Oklahoma's 5th congressional district was an open seat after Mary Fallin retired to run for Governor of Oklahoma. Calvey ran for Oklahoma's 5th congressional district in the 2010 United States House of Representatives elections in Oklahoma. He finished first in the Republican primary, but lost the runoff election to James Lankford.

Oklahoma House of Representatives (2014-2018)
Calvey was reelected to the Oklahoma House of Representatives and served from 2014 to 2018.

In April 2015, during a House debate on a bill to raise the pay for Oklahoma Supreme Court Justices, Calvey said “If I were not a Christian, and didn’t have a prohibition against suicide, I’d walk across the street and douse myself in gasoline and set myself on fire!” He later clarified he was trying to draw attention to Oklahoma Supreme Court rulings that struck down anti-abortion laws.

In 2018, Calvey reported threatening phone calls to his legislative office to the Oklahoma State Bureau of Investigation.

Oklahoma County Commissioner
Calvey declared his candidacy in 2017 for the District 3 Commissioner of Oklahoma County, seeking to represent portions of Oklahoma City, Edmond and Arcadia. Calvey won the nomination in the June 26th Republican primary.  Calvey resigned from the House of Representatives, following the November 6, 2018 general election where he was elected as an Oklahoma County Commissioner.

Calvey was sworn in at the Oklahoma County Commissioners meeting on January 3, 2019.

2022 Oklahoma County DA Race

Calvey chose to not run for reelection as County Commission but instead to run for Oklahoma County district attorney in 2022. He received 45.61% of the vote, losing to Democrat Vicki Behenna with 54.4% of the vote.

Electoral history

References

1966 births
Candidates in the 2010 United States elections
Living people
Politicians from Milwaukee
Oklahoma National Guard personnel
Republican Party members of the Oklahoma House of Representatives